Clara Driscoll (April 2, 1881 – July 17, 1945), was a Texas-born businesswoman, philanthropist, and historic preservationist who provided the money to save the Alamo Mission in San Antonio. In 1967, a Texas Historical Marker (number 6461) honoring Driscoll was placed at 2312 San Gabriel Avenue, Austin. In 1978, Texas Historical Marker number 1287 honoring Driscoll was placed at the Driscoll Family Mausoleum, Alamo Masonic Cemetery, East Commerce St., San Antonio.

Biography

Family background

Driscoll's grandfather Daniel O'Driscoll had been born in County Cork, Ireland.  and was a veteran of the Battle of San Jacinto. In return for his service, he was awarded , plus an additional one-third of a league of land, in Victoria County, Texas.  He also served as a Refugio County Judge.  In 1837, Daniel married Catherine McGrath Duggan (1796–1852), of Cashel, County Tipperary, Ireland, widow of Pat Duggan. Daniel became stepfather to Catherine's and Pat's children, Michael, John and Ellen, who later married Mississippi plantation owner Daniel C Doughty.  Mr. O'Driscoll died in an accident in 1849 and is buried at Mt. Calvary Cemetery in Refugio.

Catherine and Daniel had two sons, Jeremiah (1838–1890) and Robert Sr (1841–1914), Clara's father. Upon Catherine's death in 1852, Ellen and Daniel Doughty sold the Mississippi plantation and moved to Refugio to raise the boys.  Both Jeremiah and Robert Driscoll Sr. were Privates in the Refugio Home Guard Unit during the American Civil War. Jeremiah and Robert Sr. expanded their operations into a multimillion-dollar operation in ranching, banking and commercial developments in Nueces County, Texas, in particular Corpus Christi.

Clara Driscoll was born on April 2, 1881, to Robert Driscoll Sr. and the former Julia Fox (1834–1899) on Copano Bay in St. Mary's of Aransas  in Refugio County, Texas.  Clara's brother Robert Driscoll Jr. was born October 31, 1871, near Victoria.  He died July 7, 1929.

Education

Clara was fluent in four languages and educated at private academies: Mrs. Gregory's School in San Antonio, Texas; Miss Peebles & Miss Thompson's School for Girls in New York City; and Château de Dieudonne, a finishing school in Bornel, France.

Writing career

In 1905, Clara published The Girl of La Gloria, and in 1906 she published In the Shadow of the Alamo.

The three-act comic opera Mexicana,  was adapted from a book by Driscoll, and was financed by her. Music was by John Raymond Hubbell with lyrics by Clara Driscoll and Robert Bache Smith.  The production ran at the Lyric Theatre (New York) for 82 performances, from January 29, 1906, to April 7, 1906. It was produced by Lee Shubert, Jacob J. Shubert and The Shubert Organization. Listed among her friends in attendance were both United States senators from Texas, Joseph W. Bailey and Charles Allen Culberson as well as three Texas members of the United States House of Representatives, James L. Slayden, Albert S. Burleson and John Nance Garner, who would become Vice President (1933–1941) under President Franklin Delano Roosevelt.

Marriage, Laguna Gloria and divorce

On July 31, 1906, Clara married Tennessee-born Henry Hulme Sevier in St. Patrick's Cathedral, New York. The couple honeymooned in Europe and settled in the Sevier villa on Long Island. When Robert Driscoll Sr. died in 1914, the Seviers returned to Texas to be involved in the Driscoll family business. In 1917, Hal Sevier founded the Austin American-Statesman.

Hal remembered his wife's fondness for Lake Como in Italy during their honeymoon, and sought to give her the Texas version.  In August 1915, they bought  acres on Lake Austin at Mount Bonnell overlooking the Colorado River five miles (8 km) west of Austin.  The land had originally been purchased by Stephen F. Austin who died before he could develop it.  They chose the name Laguna Gloria, and Clara supervised the development of the estate and construction of the 15-room mansion, which became Clara's showplace for entertaining visitors from around the world.

From 1922 to 1926, university student Mary Lubbock Lasswell became a frequent visitor to Laguna Gloria. Mary described Clara as a magnetic personality with reddish-black hair and brown eyes, and who was "exceedingly outspoken".  Lasswell remembered that both the Seviers were fond of Mexican and Spanish songs. Mary likened Clara to "an eagle among a flock of pouter pigeons".

Clara closed Laguna Gloria when her brother died in 1929 and the Seviers returned to the Palo Alto ranch headquarters. Clara managed the family's businesses and became president of Corpus Christi Bank and Trust Company.

In 1933, President Franklin Roosevelt appointed Hal Sevier as ambassador extraordinary and minister plenipotentiary to Chile. In 1935, the couple became legally separated. They never had any children. The couple divorced on July 7, 1937 and Clara resumed the use of her maiden name.

Saving the Alamo

Driscoll returned from Europe in 1898  and settled in San Antonio. She was alarmed at the state of the Alamo, stating her opinion in the San Antonio Express that "unsightly obstructions" near the Alamo should be removed to allow the Alamo to stand alone.

The public entrance known as the Alamo's mission chapel was already owned by the State of Texas, which had purchased the building from the Roman Catholic Church in 1883 and had given custody to the City of San Antonio. The city had made no improvements to the chapel structure and ownership did not include the long barracks (convento).

In 1903, Adina Emilia De Zavala enlisted Clara Driscoll to join the Daughters of the Republic of Texas and chair the De Zavala fundraising committee to negotiate the purchase of the long barracks that was owned by wholesale grocers Charles Hugo, Gustav Schmeltzer and William Heuermann.  The asking price was $75,000, most of which came out of Clara Driscoll's bank account. On January 26, 1905, the state legislature approved and Governor S.W.T Lanham signed legislation for state funding to preserve the Alamo property. The state reimbursed Clara Driscoll and on October 4, 1905, the governor formally conveyed the Alamo property, including the convento and the mission church, to the Daughters of the Republic of Texas.

A divide between two factions erupted over how the long barracks property was to be used.  Driscoll and others  believed it was not part of the original structure and should be turned into a park.  Clara offered to raze the building at her own expense. De Zavala was adamant that the long barracks was part of the original building and where the major part of the battle had occurred. In 1908, De Zavala had a stand-off with authorities inside the structure. By 1911, Governor Oscar Branch Colquitt ordered the long barracks be restored to its original condition as it was in mission days. During the 1912 restoration, workers discovered foundation work that verified De Zavala's instincts that the structure had indeed been an original part of the Alamo. However, Governor Colquitt was eventually unsuccessful in preserving the barracks building and when he was out of town on business Lieutenant Governor William Harding Mayes allowed for the further removal of the second floor of the structure. Driscoll then succeeded in obtaining an injunction preventing the state from initiating any reconstruction work of the convent and a case was upheld on appeal, allowing the Daughters of the Republic of Texas to remain as custodians in 1913.

Clara continued to work on behalf of the Alamo  for the rest of her life.  In 1931, she again put up $70,000 of her own money to help the state legislature purchase more city property surrounding the shrine. In 1933, she backed down city engineers who wanted to purchase a portion of the Alamo property to widen Houston Street. By 1935, the persuasive Driscoll talked the City of San Antonio Fire Department out of putting a new fire station adjacent to the Alamo. As president of the DRT in 1936, she oversaw Centennial celebrations of the shrine.

When Clara died in 1945, her body lay in state in the Alamo chapel.

Political involvement

Driscoll served as the Democratic party's national committeewoman from Texas 1922–1938 and supported her friend John Nance Garner's  1940 bid for the Presidency. Garner's campaign cost $165,000. After Franklin D. Roosevelt was reelected, she remained loyal to FDR.

Upon her death, Time magazine described Clara's political acumen:

Money Player. Politicians soon learned to respect her: she could drink, battle, cuss and connive with the best of them, outspend practically all of them. Uvalde's white-browed John Nance Garner became her great & good friend—in & out of smoke-filled rooms, they understood each other. She made quadrennial $25,000 donations to national campaigns, but know-how, not money, worked her up to national committeewoman.

Civic and philanthropic endeavors

Driscoll served as vice chairman of the Texas Centennial Exposition executive board.

In 1939, Clara donated $92,000 to the Texas Federation of Women's Clubs, which paid off all debts against their headquarters known as The Mansion. In response, committee workers declared October 4, 1939, as Clara Driscoll Day in Austin. There was a reception, candle lighting, and unveiling of a portrait titled "Clara Driscoll, Patriot" by Corpus Christi artist Roy Miller.

Clara built the Hotel Robert Driscoll, which opened on May 25, 1942, in Corpus Christi, to memorialize her brother. Clara maintained a penthouse suite in the hotel.  The structure is now the Wells Fargo Building.

In 1943, Clara deeded Laguna Gloria and a $5,000 gift to Texas Fine Arts Association Holding Company.

At her death, she established the Driscoll Foundation Children's Hospital in Corpus Christi.

Further reading

See also
Alamo Mission in San Antonio
Daughters of the Republic of Texas
Adina Emilia De Zavala

References

External links
 
The Clara Driscoll Arts Award
Laguna Gloria
The Alamo
Daughters of the Republic of Texas
Driscoll Children's Hospital
Driscoll Middle School-San Antonio

1881 births
1945 deaths
People from Austin, Texas
20th-century American businesspeople
20th-century American businesswomen
Historical preservationists
American people of Irish descent
20th-century American philanthropists